Torsten Hillberg (1892–1954) was a Swedish stage and film actor. He played character parts in over sixty films from the silent era to the 1950s. He was married to the actress Linnéa Hillberg.

Selected filmography

 A Lover in Pawn (1920)
 Johan Ulfstjerna (1923)
 Iron Will (1923)
 The Ghost of Bragehus (1936)
 John Ericsson, Victor of Hampton Roads (1937)
 Witches' Night (1937)
 Career (1938)
 Whalers (1939)
 We at Solglantan (1939)
 The Two of Us (1939)
 They Staked Their Lives (1940)
 A Real Man (1940)
 Heroes in Yellow and Blue (1940)
 The Three of Us (1940)
 Poor Ferdinand (1941)
 Dangerous Ways (1942)
 Ombyte av tåg (1943)
 In Darkest Smaland (1943)
 There's a Fire Burning (1943)
 Little Napoleon (1943)
 Katrina (1943)
 A Girl for Me (1943)
 Blizzard (1944)
 The People of Hemsö (1944)
 His Excellency (1944)
 Man's Woman (1945)
 The Bells of the Old Town (1946)
 Two Women (1947)

References

Bibliography
 Steene, Birgitta. Ingmar Bergman: A Guide to References and Resources. Amsterdam University Press, 2005. G.K. Hall, 1987

External links

1892 births
1954 deaths
Swedish male film actors
Swedish male stage actors
Actors from Gothenburg

sv:Torsten Hillberg